Moegistorhynchus is a genus of tangle-veined flies in the family Nemestrinidae. It was described in 1840 by Pierre-Justin-Marie Macquart.

Species 
This genus has at least 6 species, 4 are described.

 Moegistorynchus braunsi Bequaert, 1935
 Moegistorynchus brevirostris (Wiedemann, 1821)
 Moegistorhynchus longirostris (Wiedemann, 1819)
 Moegistorhynchus perplexus Bequaert, 1935

References 

Nemestrinoidea
Taxa named by Pierre-Justin-Marie Macquart
Nemestrinoidea genera